Janet Fairbank (June 18, 1903 – September 25, 1947) was an American operatic singer.

She was the Chicago-born  daughter of novelist and suffragette Janet Ayer Fairbank and Kellogg Fairbank, the son of industrialist N. K. Fairbank and the niece of Pulitzer Prize–winning novelist Margaret Ayer Barnes.

A soprano, her debut in Chicago in 1931 was followed by a debut in Europe in 1932 and an initial appearance in opera (as Zerlina in Don Giovanni) in 1933. She appeared with the San Carlo Opera Company in Chicago in 1934 and with the Chicago Opera in 1934-35 and in 1940-41. She also appeared with the Civic Orchestra of Chicago, the Grant Park Orchestra, and other companies. She was also a patron of contemporary music, and provided encouragement and support to numerous recognized and aspiring composers including Virgil Thomson, David Diamond, Francis Poulenc, Benjamin Britten, Lou Harrison, Olivier Messiaen, Ned Rorem, Paul Bowles, Gottfried von Einem, and John Cage.

Death
Janet Fairbank died in her native Chicago in 1947, aged 44, from leukemia.

References

1903 births
1947 deaths
American sopranos
20th-century American women opera singers
Deaths from leukemia
Deaths from cancer in Illinois
Singers from Chicago